Máximo González and Fabrice Martin defeated Ivan Dodig and Filip Polášek in the final, 7–6(14–12), 6–3, to win the men's doubles tennis title at the 2020 Adelaide International. This was the first edition of the event.

Seeds

Draw

Draw

References

External links
 Main Draw

Adelaide International
2020 Men's Doubles
Adelaide
January 2020 sports events in Australia